The 2020–21 Lithuanian Handball League season was the 32nd season of the Lithuanian Handball League, the top level handball in Lithuania. Eight teams participated in the league. League started at 2 September 2020 and finished on 22 May 2021 in Vilnius.

VHC Šviesa won Lithuanian Handball League for the first time.

Regular season

Playoffs

Statistics

Top goalscorers

References

External links
 Official website

2020–21 domestic handball leagues
2020 in Lithuanian sport
2021 in Lithuanian sport
Lithuanian Handball League seasons